Brookfoot is a village in Calderdale West Yorkshire, England.
The Calder and Hebble Navigation and the River Calder runs through Brookfoot. Near the River and canal there is a  3½-acre (1.4 hectares) lake known as Brookfoot lake owned by The Brighouse Angling Association.

See also
Elland
Brighouse

External links

The Brighouse Angling Association

Villages in West Yorkshire